Kim Sol-mi (born 20 November 1990) is a North Korean judoka.

She won gold at the 2011 World Military Judo Championship. At the 2013 World Judo Championships, in Rio de Janeiro, Brazil, she finished fifth. She took bronze at the 2014 Grand Slam in Abu Dhabi, UAE. That year, she also took the bronze at the Grand Prix in Qingdao, China. She took the bronze at the 2015 Asian Judo Championships in Kuwait.

At the 2016 Asian Judo Championships in Tashkent, Uzbekistan she finished third.

She competed in the women's (48 kg) judo event at the 2016 Summer Olympics in Rio de Janeiro, where she did not advance past her first match.

See also

North Korea at the 2016 Summer Olympics

References

External links

North Korean female judoka
Living people
1990 births
Judoka at the 2016 Summer Olympics
Olympic judoka of North Korea
Judoka at the 2014 Asian Games
Asian Games medalists in judo
Asian Games bronze medalists for North Korea
Medalists at the 2014 Asian Games
21st-century North Korean women